"Trouble on My Mind" is a song by American hip hop recording artist Pusha T, released as the lead single from his debut EP Fear of God II: Let Us Pray. It was produced by longtime collaborators The Neptunes along with Odd Future's Left Brain and features a guest appearance from fellow American rapper and Odd Future's frontman Tyler, the Creator. The song was unveiled July 8, 2011, and premiered via RedBullUSA.com, it was officially released on July 12, through iTunes and Amazon. The song was also included on the soundtrack to the film Project X.

Reception

Critical response 
In response, Tyler's verses were met with more criticism than Pusha T's, though the song as a whole was acclaimed.

Music video
On July 15, 2011, a behind-the-scenes look at the video was released. The music video, directed by Jason Goldwatch and filmed in Los Angeles, California, was released July 20, 2011. The video features cameo appearances from the rest of Odd Future.

Release Information

Purchasable Release

References

2011 singles
Pusha T songs
Tyler, the Creator songs
Song recordings produced by the Neptunes
Songs written by Pharrell Williams
Songs written by Chad Hugo
Music videos directed by Jason Goldwatch
GOOD Music singles
2011 songs
Songs written by Pusha T
Songs written by Tyler, the Creator